Yeison Javier Devoz Anaya (born 4 April 1989) is a Colombian football forward. He is currently free agent.

Titles

References

Living people
Colombian footballers
1989 births
Atlético Nacional footballers
Alianza Petrolera players
Real Cartagena footballers
Águilas Doradas Rionegro players
Association football forwards
Sportspeople from Cartagena, Colombia